Hatraj is a village development committee in Baitadi District in the Mahakali Zone of western Nepal.

References

Populated places in Baitadi District